The Sumqayit tramway was a tramway forming part of the public transport system in Sumqayit, the third most populous city in Azerbaijan, for more than 40 years in the second half of the 20th century.

History
The tramway was opened on 11 March 1959, and was powered by electricity.  It only ever consisted of one line, and was closed in July 2003.

Fleet 
In the period leading up to its closure, the tramway was operated by KTM-5 type trams.

See also

List of town tramway systems in Asia

References

External links

 

Transport in Sumgait
Sumqayit
Sumqayit